Since the debut of the first Mega Man video game in 1987, numerous characters have been introduced into the series.

Overview

Key:

 = Does Not Appear

List indicator(s)
 A dark grey cell indicates that the character was not in the property or that the character's presence in the property has yet to be announced.
 A Main indicates a character had a starring role in the property.
 A Recurring indicates the character appeared in two or more times within the property.
 A Guest indicates the character appeared once in the property.

Classic Mega Man characters

Main characters

Mega Man

Originally created as a lab assistant named "Rock" by Dr. Light, he was modified for battle after Dr. Wily reprogrammed the original Robot Masters to take over the world. Due to his Variable Weapons System, he can copy the weapon of any Robot Master and use it as his own.

Dr. Light
He is the creator of Mega Man and several other robots, and can be considered the father of Mega Man, Roll, and Proto Man. While a pacifist, he reluctantly recognizes that the use of force can be a necessity. He plays a supporting role, often developing and distributing new gear. In the Mega Man X series, set 100 years after the original series, Dr. Light resumes his supporting role through enhancement capsules that contain upgrades to X's systems together with messages relayed by silver/blue, slightly translucent holographic projections of the deceased scientist. He also appears in the "Navi Mode" of Mega Man and Mega Man 6 in the Mega Man Anniversary Collection to provide gameplay hints to Mega Man. Though Light died before the X series, his legacy continued through his last creation “X”.

He is voiced by Antony Holland in Captain N: The Game Master, Jim Byrnes in the 90s TV series, Randall Wiebe in Mega Man X8, Mega Man Maverick Hunter X, and Mega Man Powered Up, Michael Mislove in Marvel vs. Capcom Infinite, Doug Stone in Mega Man 11, and Garry Chalk in Mega Man: Fully Charged.

Dr. Wily

 is a mad scientist and the main antagonist. He was originally a colleague of Dr. Light during their days as university students. Driven by jealousy towards Light and his achievements overshadowing his own, he reprogrammed Light's robots, with the exception of Rock and Roll, to assist him in taking over the world. He was however defeated by Rock, who upgraded to the combat robot "Mega Man". Wily returned as the antagonist in subsequent titles of the main series with a different scheme each time, only to be defeated and surrender to Mega Man at the end.

Wily has also been instrumental in the backgrounds of other characters in the series. He repaired the prototype for Mega Man, "Proto Man", and in Mega Man 7 used what he learned during the process to create his answer to Light's work, Bass. After Bass proved to be unreliable, Wily refined his design, creating the robot Zero. Zero would appear in the Mega Man X and Mega Man Zero games as a hero working alongside Light's last creation, "X". Though Wily died prior to the X series, his legacy continued through a virus initially carried by Zero and transferred to Sigma, creating the X series antagonist "Sigma Virus", along with all the Mavericks.

Beyond their armor and personality, Proto Man and Mega Man are supposedly identical. However, at the end of Mega Man 2: The Power Fighters, it is revealed by Dr. Light that Proto Man's body has a fatal defect in its energy system, and as a result, is in great pain and has a more limited lifespan. He also appears in the "Navi Mode" of Mega Man 3 in the Mega Man Anniversary Collection to provide gameplay hints to Mega Man.

Bass
SWN-001 Bass,  in Japan, is a robot designed by Dr. Wily. He was constructed based on research conducted on Mega Man with the intention of matching his power, being a more advanced model of Robot Master when compared to Mega Man. Wily makes mention of discovering the energy that powers Bass, Bassnium, the most powerful form of energy on Earth, entirely by mistake. Despite being created by Wily and being more competent in his abilities, Bass frequently rebels against his creator when he feels Wily is standing between him and defeating Mega Man. He desires to defeat Mega Man and be acknowledged as the world's strongest robot. Though he wants to defeat Mega Man, Bass has worked together with him numerous times, though usually for his own purposes.

Bass's weapon is the powerful Bass Buster, which originally functioned similarly to the Mega Buster, albeit with slightly different shots.  As of Mega Man & Bass, however, the Bass Buster has lost its ability to charge its shots in favor of an increased rate of fire and ability to fire upwards and diagonally. Unlike the Mega Buster, the bullets do not travel through solid surfaces unless an upgrade is acquired and equipped. Like Mega Man and Proto Man, Bass can also copy the weapons of Robot Masters, his body changing colors to reflect the weapon currently equipped.  He can also combine with his robotic wolf  for the Treble Boost, allowing Bass to take flight and shoot more powerful projectiles from his buster.

Save for a cameo showing a schematic of Bass, Bass is absent in Mega Man 9. His absence was not explained, although according to the booklet that came with the Rockman 9 Arranged Album, Bass was undergoing some adjustments. He is playable in Mega Man 10, retaining his dash and rapid-fire, multi-directional arm cannon capabilities (though not his double jump), if additional downloadable content is purchased for the game. In the game's re-release as part of Mega Man Legacy Collection 2, Bass is instead unlocked by either completing the game or by using the secret code at the title screen of Mega Man 10.

In Mega Man 2: The Power Fighters, Zero makes a cameo appearance, and Wily says that it is a creation that will surpass even Bass itself. Bass says that he will destroy this creation, and that no other robot is more powerful than he is.

Roll

 is a female robot designed for housekeeping instead of fighting.  She is the younger "sister" of Mega Man, and plays a supporting role in the first game, and plays a more substantive role in subsequent sequels. Her name was never mentioned until Mega Man 3, marking her return, where her entry in Dr. Light's robot list is shown during the ending. She also appears in the "Navi Mode" of Mega Man 2 in the Mega Man Anniversary Collection to provide gameplay hints to Mega Man.

She is usually depicted in a red outfit with blonde hair in a ponytail. In Mega Man 8, she wears a new black and red dress with red boots and a green ribbon tying her ponytail up. While she was not designed for fighting, she is a combatant in the fighting games, Marvel vs. Capcom and Marvel vs. Capcom 2. She also appears as a playable character in Tatsunoko vs. Capcom: Ultimate All Stars, and Mega Man Powered Up. Alternate versions of Roll appear in two other Mega Man spinoff series: Roll Caskett in Mega Man Legends, and Roll.EXE in Mega Man Battle Network. Roll also appears in various other Mega Man media, including manga and the Mega Man cartoon.

Rush
 is a robotic dog belonging to Mega Man. He is introduced in Mega Man 3, and has appeared in many games since.  Created by Dr. Light to be an all around support unit, Rush has the ability to transform into various forms. Rush Marine transforms Rush into a small, one-seated submarine, and Rush Jet transforms his legs into jet engines that let him take flight. Rush also has the Rush Coil, which is a spring that pops out of his back and helps Mega Man reach higher platforms that he normally can't access. Other games have him transform into a motorcycle and a drill car, and in the fourth and fifth Game Boy games as a spaceship. In later games, the Rush Adaptor allows Rush to attach himself to Mega Man, allowing him to float, shoot more powerful blasts, and launch his arms as projectiles.  In a couple of games including Mega Man 7 and Mega Man 8, Rush can be used to obtain helpful items, such as health.  Rush is seen as a Scooby-Doo like character in the Ruby Spears cartoon show. Popularly believed that the name of the character was another musical reference in homage of the band called Rush, but currently it is known that was inspired by another Capcom game named Rush & Crash. and the pronunciation of the name be similar to Lassie that is another dog character.

Supporting characters

Auto
Auto (Rightot in Japan) was created by Dr. Light as a lab assistant, due to Rock being unable to fulfill that role after his adoption of the superhero identity "Mega Man". He is introduced in Mega Man 7, where he provides Mega Man with upgrades and parts. However, despite his relatively late introduction, it is implied that Auto has been around for some time.  In Mega Man 8, Auto assists Mega Man in the Rush Jet scenes, using a rocket launcher as well as a propeller in his head that allows him to fly.  He also appears in Mega Man & Bass, creating upgrades for the player in exchange for 'bolts' dropped by defeated enemies. He returns again in Mega Man 11 as Dr. Light's lab assistant, and helps Mega Man by creating new parts for him from bolts collected from enemies. He also made a cameo appearance (or a robot of very similar appearance to him) in CD versions of Mega Man X3, watching TV in the background of the FMV intro for Volt Catfish's stage, making him the only robot from the classic series to also be seen in the X series.

Beat
Beat is a robotic bird that has appeared in many Mega Man games.  He was created by Dr. Cossack to provide additional support to Mega Man during the events of Mega Man 5.  Several of the games require the player to obtain a certain number of Beat Plates in order to use Beat.  Beat homes in on enemies, providing damage by slamming into them. He would perform the same function in Mega Man 6, however he would not attack bosses as he did in the previous game. In Mega Man 7, Mega Man 9, Mega Man 10 and Mega Man 11, he rescues Mega Man (and Proto Man in Mega Man 10) from pits. In Mega Man 8, he can assist Mega Man during the Rush Jet scenes. He also provides Mega Man with an energy barrier in Mega Man & Bass. He assists Duo and Proto Man as a temporary invincibility power-up in Power Fighters.

Dr. Cossack
Dr. Mikhail Sergeyevich Cossack was a Russian colleague of Dr. Light. He appeared in Mega Man 4 as the main antagonist; however, it turns out he was being blackmailed, as Wily had kidnapped his daughter Kalinka. When Kalinka was rescued by Proto Man and the truth was revealed, Dr. Cossack turned on Wily and becomes an ally to Mega Man. He is the inventor of Beat and the Super Mega Buster, as well as numerous industrial and military robots. He also appears in the "Navi Mode" of Mega Man 5 in the Mega Man Anniversary Collection to provide gameplay hints to Mega Man.

Duo
Duo is a robot hailing from outer space, designed to preserve peace and justice in the universe. Duo was formally introduced in Mega Man 8, battling a robot powered by Evil Energy. After crashing to Earth, he is repaired by Dr. Light, and soon becomes an ally of Mega Man.  After finally eradicating the Evil Energy on Earth, he thanks Mega Man and leaves Earth to resume his search.  He later appears in Mega Man 2: The Power Fighters, which was actually released before Mega Man 8 (but set after it), Mega Man Battle & Chase, and Rockman Strategy.

The bulk of Duo's offensive abilities are attributed to his powerful left arm, with a fist nearly as large as his own torso, and his large spiked body.  He attacks primarily by punching, though he is capable of using projectile weapons, the most powerful of which is a blast in the shape of his own hand.  He also appears to have the same weapon copying abilities displayed by Mega Man, Proto Man, and Bass. As with them, his body changes color in accordance with the weapon he has equipped.  Also, having been created for the purpose of destroying Evil Energy, he seems to have the unique ability to purge said energy from an infected victim's body, as demonstrated when saving Mega Man.

Eddie
Eddie, originally known as Flip Top in early Western manuals, was created by Dr. Light as a "walking suitcase", usually sent to help Mega Man by providing random recovery items during the game.  He is also able to fire bombs out of his head while assisting Mega Man in the Rush Jet sections of Mega Man 8.  Eddie first appeared in Mega Man 4.  Starting from Mega Man 7, Eddie only appears in the shop and no longer gives items to Mega Man.

Kalinka
Kalinka Cossack is Dr. Cossack's daughter, who was kidnapped by Proto Man (on Dr. Wily's orders) in order to force her father into unwillingly declaring war against Mega Man on Wily's behalf. She was however rescued by Proto Man right before Mega Man managed to defeat Cossack in his citadel. Kalinka is not present in any other games in the series, but appears in the "Navi Mode" of Mega Man 4 in the Mega Man Anniversary Collection to provide gameplay hints to Mega Man.

Kalinka is named after the famous Russian song of the same name.

King
King is a powerful robot appearing in Mega Man and Bass as the apparent main antagonist. Declaring himself the king of all robots, he seeks to wipe out humanity and establish a world populated only by robots. Mega Man and Bass had to battle him and many robots that had joined his army; when either one finally defeats King, it's revealed that he had actually been programmed to form a rebellion by Dr. Wily. While King seemingly dies after this revelation, during Mega Man's ending it is revealed that he survived and is now a wanderer, much like Proto Man. He then apologizes for his actions that he had caused and wishes to meet up with Mega Man peacefully.

King possesses an array of powerful weapons, including a shield that works a lot like Enker's, which is capable of absorbing almost any attack and firing it back in the form of a massive laser beam.  His other primary weapon is a massive battle-axe capable of slicing even Proto Man in half with one hit.  He also has the ability to merge with other vehicles to form King Jet Robo and King Tank Robo, the penultimate bosses of the game.

Tango
  is a green robotic cat and one of Mega Man's allies. Tango can roll himself into a buzzsaw and dive into enemies, until all in-area enemies are defeated, he falls into a pit or spikes, or his energy is expended. Tango only appears in Mega Man V for the Game Boy, Rockman & Forte Mirai kara no Chōsensha for the WonderSwan and makes a cameo on Mega Man 10 in the item shop when playing with Proto Man. Like many other characters, Tango's name is musical-themed.

Reggae
Reggae is a robotic bird who is the pet of Dr. Wily. He is featured in a drama CD featured only in Japan.  He was featured in Wily & Right no RockBoard: That's Paradise (or RockBoard for short) and Rockman & Forte: Challenger From the Future as a weapon for Bass.  His first cameo outside Japan is in Mega Man 7, where he appears if an invalid password is entered. He also appears as the shop keeper when playing as Bass in Mega Man 10.  Archie Comic's adaptation of Mega Man has him play a more prominent role, usually mocking Dr. Wily's various failures in the "Short Circuits" section.

Treble
 is Bass' equivalent to Mega Man's dog, Rush. Like Rush, Treble can assume a jet-like form and flym though he does so in the form of an armored suit known as the "Treble Boost". Created after Bass stole designs for the Super Adapter in Mega Man 7, it gives Bass limited flight capability and increased firepower. In Mega Man & Bass, the Treble Boost also grants Bass invulnerability while its energy lasts. The Treble Boost is also present in Mega Man 10, functioning similarly to its previous incarnation, but without the invulnerability. The name Treble clearly continues the music theme of the original Japanese character names, and Gospel likely refers to the musical genre of the same name.

Met
The Met (short for the Metall, Mettool, and Mettaur variants of the name), also known as "Hard Hat", is a flagship enemy of the series.  Appearing in nearly every game, the average Met is a tiny construction robot wearing a disproportionately-sized hard hat with a "plus" sign marked on it.  Mets usually wait below their helmet before attacking, as it is impervious to nearly all of Mega Man's weapons.  They appear in the various series of the Mega Man metaseries, with many different variations and forms, and very different from Sniper Joes, their look has practically not changed through the centuries in the lore of the metaseries (a Met from Mega Man ZX is identical to one from the original Mega Man series). In the original Mega Man, another common enemy character named the Picket Man, has a head similar to the Met, but with a full body, a shield, and a pickaxe. The Mets are a staple to the Mega Man series as the Goombas are to Super Mario Bros. The Mets appear in Super Smash Bros. for Nintendo 3DS and Wii U as a collectable trophy in both versions, as well as being enemies in the 3DS exclusive Smash Run mode.

Sniper Joe
Sniper Joe is a humanoid built by Dr. Light and later modified for infantry by Dr. Wily. They were based on Proto Man and are mass-produced for combat. Sniper Joes are a recurring enemy throughout the classic series, and many of the numerous variants often involve a Sniper Joe operating machines such as walkers, gun turrets, jet skis and helicopters. They have a head containing a full face black visor, resembling a motorcycle helmet with a single red eye.

Yellow Devil
The Yellow Devil is a powerful combat robot created by Dr. Wily. It is a giant robot with a body made from a shape-memory alloy, which it uses to split into multiple pieces and reform elsewhere. At the center of the body is a single, mechanical eye, which keeps the body together and is also its one and only weakness. The Yellow Devil is a recurring boss character throughout the series, with numerous successors and offshoots appearing in other games (such as the Yellow Devil MK-II in Mega Man 3, the Green Devil in Mega Man 8, and the Block Devil in Mega Man 10. Other Devil variants also appear in the various series of the Mega Man metaseries, including the Shadow Devil in Mega Man X5 and the Rainbow Devil in Mega Man Zero.

Early Western media referred to the Yellow Devil as the "Rock Monster", a change made due to Nintendo's policies regarding religious figures and names. However, the "Devil" name has since been used in more recent American releases. The Mega Man/Sonic the Hedgehog crossover produced by Archie Comics featured the Chaos Devil, a being combining the Yellow Devil concept with Chaos.

Mega Man Killers
The Mega Man Killers are a series of robots appearing in the Game Boy series.  The Mega Man Killers are robots created by Doctor Wily to destroy Mega Man, who in turn defeats each one of them and eventually foils Wily's most devious schemes.  All of them reappear as bosses in Game Boy version of Mega Man V, and all of them also reappear as bosses in the DLC stages from Mega Man 10. All of them are named after notable music genres.

Robot Masters
Robot Masters are a special kind of robot, mainly under the control of Dr. Wily, that possess a very advanced level of artificial intelligence. The system is jointly credited to Dr. Light and Dr. Wily, and most Robot Masters possess a unique identification code, consisting of a two-letter "series code" followed by one of N, No, or #, then a three-digit "serial number". They are generally humanoid in appearance, and they are often designed with specific purposes and human-like personalities and quirks. The list below is of the first six Robot Masters that were built by Dr. Light and reprogrammed by Dr. Wily, as well as two more that were added to Mega Man Powered Up so as to be consistent with other Mega Man games.

Mega Man 1 / Mega Man Powered Up Robot Masters
These Robot Masters were created by Dr. Light and were reprogrammed by Dr. Wily to serve him:

Mega Man 2 Robot Masters
These Robot Masters were the first line created solely by Dr. Wily to destroy Mega Man:

Mega Man 3 Robot Masters
Most of the Robot Masters listed here were created by Dr. Light and Dr. Wily at the time of their truce.

Mega Man 4 Robot Masters
These Robot Masters were created by Dr. Cossack, and remodelled into battle robots by Dr. Wily after he took Dr. Cossack's daughter Kalinka hostage.

Mega Man 5 Robot Masters
Dr. Wily created these Robot Masters in his next attempt to take over the world.

Mega Man 6 Robot Masters
These Robot Masters were created for the First Annual Robot Tournament and were reprogrammed by Dr. Wily in the alias of Mr. X.

Mega Man 7 Robot Masters
Four of the robots were created by Dr. Wily to activate and find him if he is not there to activate a certain code to keep them stasis. These robots activated during the time when Dr. Wily was in prison. After his escape, Dr. Wily obtained four more robots to serve him.

Mega Man 8 Robot Masters
Some of the Robot Masters were created by Dr. Wily while the others were stolen and repurposed by him.

Mega Man 9 Robot Masters
These Robot Masters were created by Dr. Light and were tricked by Dr. Wily into serving him who saved them from being scrapped after their period of use had expired.

Mega Man 10 Robot Masters
These following Robot Masters contracted Roboenza as Mega Man had to salvage parts of them to help Dr. Light find a cure for Roboenza.

Mega Man 11 Robot Masters
These Robot Masters have different manufacturers until they were captured during Dr. Light's maintenance on them and reprogrammed to serve Dr. Wily who also equipped them with his Double Gear System device. After Dr. Wily's plot is thwarted, Dr. Light and a Double Gear System-enhanced Auto recovered their bodies and worked to rebuild them and restore them to normal.

Mega Man & Bass Robot Masters
Besides Tengu Man and Astro Man, the following Robot Masters were used by King in his robot revolution. Some of them were created by King while others were modified by King.

Stardroids
The Stardroids (Space Rulers  in Japan) are a group of alien Robot Masters featured in Mega Man V. Hailing from an ancient alien civilization, Dr. Wily discovered them in some ruins and reactivated them as part of his plans to dominate the Earth. They are led by Terra (Earth  in Japan) and are made of materials that normal weapons cannot damage, forcing Dr. Light to create the Mega Arm to counter them. Among them, Dr. Wily also discovered a similar robot named Sunstar (Sungod  in Japan), who was created as a doomsday weapon. Sunstar is reactivated by Wily in a last effort to destroy Mega Man, but he turns on Wily before fighting Mega Man as the game's final boss.

Mega Man X characters

The following is a list of recurring characters appearing in the Mega Man X series of video games developed and published by Capcom. Unless otherwise stated, each of these characters is a reploid; an artificially intelligent android. Names are organized in order of appearance, and characters who only appear in a single game are covered in the article for the corresponding game.

Maverick Hunters
The Maverick Hunters (Irregular Hunters  in Japan) are a group of Reploids who protect humans and other Reploids from Mavericks and the heroes of the Mega Man X series, and the protagonists of each game are prominent Maverick Hunters. When they are introduced in Mega Man X, they have already existed for quite a while, having been previously founded by Dr. Cain (who has since retired). From Mega Man X on, they battle Sigma and the other Mavericks.

X

X is the lead character of the Mega Man X series. He is originally created by Dr. Light, who feared the ramifications of giving robots free will, so he chose to seal X inside a capsule for 30 years to test the integrity and reliability of X's systems. Dr. Light died before X's diagnostics were complete, and X was discovered in his capsule 100 years later by another scientist, Dr. Cain, who attempted to emulate X's technology. With X's help, Cain developed the first mass-produced Reploids: humanoid androids based upon X's designs.

Zero

Originally intended to be the protagonist of Mega Man X, he was recast as the mentor and, later, partner of X in favor of an X who looked "more like Mega Man". He is a top class Maverick Hunter who undergoes constant inner turmoil regarding his mysterious past and purpose, of which he seems to see glimpses of in nightmares, and the fact that the Virus does not affect him like it does other reploids, who have their programs corrupted and turn erratic and violent and bent on human destruction, becoming "Maverick".

Axl
Voiced by (English): Lenne Hardt (X7); Jeffrey Watson (X8)Voiced by (Japanese): Minami Takayama
, a black and red-armored reploid with an X-shaped scar above his nose. With the attributes of a child in X7, he is a fairly recent introduction. Having first appeared in Mega Man X7, he displays the unusual ability known as A-Trans which allows him to take on the appearance and abilities of any reploid he defeats which matches his size; an ability that is initially unique that allows him to explore normally inaccessible areas. Axl is also armed with a pair of handheld blaster pistols, which he calls Axl Bullets, and the ability to hover in midair and roll through enemy shots. While his gameplay style was originally similar to X, in Mega Man X8, Axl's gameplay had been reworked to create his own distinctive fighting style. His shots now have intense rapid-fire abilities and can fire in any direction, (similar to Bass from the classic Mega Man series) and instead of copying the same Maverick weapons like X can, Axl instead gains a new type of gun for each boss he defeats which has unlimited ammo (unlike X7 where Axl could only receive three new guns which he switches to when he uses the Maverick weapons that come with them). These special guns can be fired in the same way as Axl's regular attacks (multi-directional and rapid-fire). While overall the weakest in power, Axl's fighting style relies more on speed compared to X's powerful but slower charge shots and Zero's swordplay.

Dr. Cain
Voiced by (English): Michael ShepherdVoiced by (Japanese): Tadashi Miyazawa
Dr. Cain, a human archaeologist-turned-robot expert, serves a vital, yet shrinking role in the Mega Man X games and their backstories. In the story of Mega Man X (told in the form of Dr. Cain's journals), Dr. Cain discovers the dormant X in the ruins of Dr. Light's lab. After awakening X, Cain invents Reploids, sapient robots based on X's design, with the most notable being Sigma. Sigma, being the most advanced robot at the time, was placed as the head of the Maverick Hunters (Irregular Hunters in the Japanese version), a group of reploids dedicated to destroying any reploid that violated the three rules of robotics.

Iris
Voiced by (Japanese): Yūko Mizutani
Iris was developed by Repliforce scientists as half of the "Perfect Soldier program". Colonel, her brother, was the other half. Her half was of the compassionate and peaceful one, and Colonel's was of the strong-willed Reploid warrior. Repliforce scientists had struggled to make these two factors into one Reploid, but the differences were irreconcilable, so they split them into brother and sister Reploids.

Alia
Voiced by (English): Rumiko Varnes (X7); Marriete Sluyter (X8)Voiced by (Japanese): Rumi Kasahara
Alia is a character in the Mega Man X series. She acts as a Navigator for the Maverick Hunters in Mega Man X5 and onwards.

Alia began her career as a simple researcher in Reploid engineering. She and her colleague Gate whom she was said to have feelings for, were ahead of their time in their research on Reploids, though she contends that Gate was always a better programmer than she was. However, Gate's inability to follow the rules made him a social outcast, and his creations were systematically destroyed, sometimes even with the assistance of Alia herself. She soon mastered all programming languages and was chosen on these merits to be a spotter for the Hunters. In Mega Man X5, Alia then served as the Hunters' spotter (navigator) during the Sigma Virus outbreak, while simultaneously lending her technical talents to the cause by uploading and letting X utilize his two new armors, the Falcon and Gaea armor. She supported the Hunters throughout the ordeal until it was resolved. And most of the time, she worries for her comrades.

Layer
Voiced by (English): Meredith Taylor ParryVoiced by (Japanese): Sonoko Kawata
Layer is a navigator alongside Alia and Pallette in X8. She appears as a tanned reploid with long violet hair set in a hime cut. Her high processing power allows her to quickly determine enemy abilities. For the most part, Layer appears to be the oldest navigator, staying calm and collected. However, she seems to show more concern for Zero, even blushing when talking to him. Palette's comment on how she "waited the whole time for him" seems to imply that she has a crush on him. Layer is also a secret unlockable character in the game, and has gameplay similar to Zero's. She has her own sword weapon, the "Layer Rapier", allowing her to use the same abilities as Zero, but she cannot use his "Black Armor".

Pallette
Voiced by (English): Chris SimmsVoiced by (Japanese): Haruna Mima
Pallette is another navigator alongside Alia and Layer in X8, appearing as a reploid with blonde hair and turquoise armor. She excels at finding hidden routes at facilities, often allowing X to find Dr. Light's armor capsules. She appears to be the most playful of the navigators, and hates being ignored. Pallette is also an unlockable character in the game, taking after Axl's playstyle. She cannot, however, use Axl's copy ability.

Douglas
Douglas is a mechanic for the Maverick Hunters. In Mega Man X5, he constructed power-up parts (or "modules") for X and Zero and reinforced the Enigma Cannon and Space Shuttle with the parts they gathered from the Mavericks. During the Nightmare outbreak (X6), Douglas helped X and Zero by refining power-up parts for them. Although he is still employed by the Maverick Hunters, he has not appeared in-game for a while. He is a somewhat eccentric character who prefers to look on the lighter side of things. He can fix about anything.

Signas
Voiced by (English): Robert Belgrade (X7); Roger Rhodes (X8)Voiced by (Japanese): Hirotaka Suzuoki (X7); Tsuneyoshi Iwatsuru (X8)
Signas is the newest leader and commander of the Maverick Hunters, introduced in X5. He was originally a private investigator before being assigned to the Maverick Hunters. Signas commands every mission executed by the Hunters, and he often plans out major operations, overseeing them carefully. Very loyal to humans and Reploids, Signas will stop at nothing to ensure that all Mavericks are eliminated, as he has already proven to be a worthy leader and valuable Hunter. He has the most advanced CPU of all current Reploids and is somewhat similar to Colonel from X4 in appearance.

Mavericks
Maverick ( in Japan) refers to Reploids who turned against humanity due to the effects of the Maverick Virus or of their own accord, depending on the individual.

The Mavericks also appeared as the main villains in the Worlds Unite crossover from Archie Comics, which took place between the Sonic the Hedgehog, Sonic Universe, Mega Man, and Sonic Boom comic lines. Following the events of X7, Sigma traveled back in time to Sonic the Hedgehog's home world, and later cloned the vast majority of the Mavericks featured in the series. The only exceptions are those featured in Command Mission and a handful from the other games.

Sigma

 is the primary antagonist of the Mega Man X series, considered to be the finest reploid by Dr. Willie of the time with circuitry designs meant to keep him from going Maverick . He was once the leader of the Maverick Hunters, but during a mission, he came into contact with Zero, who at the time was under the influence of the Zero Virus and had been running berserk.

Vile
Voiced by (English): Roger RhodesVoiced by (Japanese): Mugihito
Vile ( in Japanese) is a recurring major villain in the Mega Man X series, and frequently reappears as a mid-game boss. He has a distinctive helmet with a T-shaped visor, similar to that of Boba Fett. Vile is introduced in Mega Man X, where he is a former Maverick Hunter now serving Sigma as his right-hand man.

X-Hunters
They are among the few remaining followers in the Maverick rebellion and led a rebellion of their own after Sigma's death and took over the North Pole. They were also in possession of Zero's parts, which apart of their Unification Plan to rebuilt Zero as a Maverick, and they challenge X in a dual for the parts after some of their Mavericks were defeated. Each member is found in a secret area of a stage and will move to another stage. After X beat each of the X Hunters, he recovered all three parts and has a final battle with them at their lair. One by one, all of the X Hunters were destroyed and eventually X confronts a newly revived Sigma.

Dr. Doppler
 is the main antagonist of Mega Man X3. Dr. Doppler is depicted as a Reploid researcher who supposedly discovered a cure for Maverick Reploids, and even founded a city, Dopple Town, in honor of it. When the supposedly cured reploids began causing riots in Dopple Town, the Maverick Hunters held Doppler accountable. After X and Zero defeats him, Doppler reveals that he was corrupted by the viral form of Sigma, who ordered him to create a new body for him. Eventually, Zero would learn that Dr. Doppler has the true antivirus, and applies it to his Z-Saber to finish off Sigma and get X and himself out of Doppler's exploding laboratory. (Alternatively, if Zero is injured, Dr. Doppler uses his own body as the true antivirus and sacrifices himself.) Dr. Cain was his friend.

Nightmare Police
The  is duo of Reploids who were the law enforcement in Dopple Town formed by Dr. Doppler to protect it before the uprising and joining his army, consisting of Bit ( in Japan), the faster of the two, and Byte ( in Japan), the stronger of the two. Doppler sent them to destroy X and Zero. They are found and fought in any of the eight stages in Mega Man X3. If at least one of them is defeated but not destroyed, they combine to form  in the first stage of Doppler's fortress, which is an upgrade from Doppler after their first defeat.

Double
 was a supporting character in Mega Man X4. He quickly befriended X during his mission and acted as his mission operator, but as X headed off to the Final Weapon, Double revealed his true purpose: he was a spy sent by Sigma to infiltrate the Maverick Hunters, unveiling his true personality as a combat-loving sadist, cruelly taunting X about his naivety when he was defeated. After slaughtering some Maverick Hunters in their headquarters, Double went after X inside the Final Weapon, and revealed his true form to him, causing a disbelieving X to realize he was betrayed, and confronted him in combat. However, X managed to destroy him.

Dynamo
, introduced in Mega Man X5 and later recurring in Mega Man X6 as an optional boss, is a Reploid mercenary who works for Sigma.

Gate
 is the main antagonist of Mega Man X6 and a researcher who formerly worked with Alia. Bearing knowledge far ahead of his peers, Gate ended up being exiled from the research community when his colleagues, including Alia, conspired to destroy Gate's Reploids out of fear for their power and inability to be analyzed. Months later following the crash of Eurasia, Gate discovered a piece of Zero's DNA and became infected by traces of the Maverick virus within it. Obsessed with building his own utopia for only the most supreme Reploids, Gate created the Nightmare Virus and the Zero Nightmare (a distorted and deranged clone of Zero) to instill fear in the population, then revived his Reploids as the "Nightmare Investigators" that would supposedly protect them but in reality lead them to their deaths.

Isoc
Isoc is Gate's chief assistant in Mega Man X6. He is first seen giving a rousing speech to the Reploids and recruiting them as Nightmare Investigators. His actual goal, however, is to observe the effects of the Nightmare Virus and report them to Gate for further refinements. Isoc also shows an obsession with Zero, claiming that he knows everything there is to know about him.

High Max
He was created by Gate as the ultimate Reploid, using DNA taken from Zero to make him incredibly powerful and resistant to damage (though this resistance can be overwhelmed with enough force). As the leader of the Nightmare Investigators, High Max is assigned the task to seek and destroy the Zero Nightmare as part of Gate's farce to lead the "low-grade" Reploids to their deaths through blind trust.

Red
Voiced by (English): Barry GjerdeVoiced by (Japanese): Akio Ōtsuka
Red appears in Mega Man X7 as the main antagonist and the leader of Red Alert, an anti-Maverick mercenary group that had risen to prominence in place of the overworked and underequipped Maverick Hunters. He was the one who adopted and trained Axl, who looked up to Red as a father figure. After Red met with a mysterious "Professor" (Sigma) who claimed that he could increase his power, he began acting unusual and Axl took it as a sign to flee for his life, ultimately seeking asylum with the Maverick Hunters.

Lumine
Voiced by (English): Elinor HoltVoiced by (Japanese): Junko Noda
Lumine is the main antagonist of Mega Man X8. Due to being a new generation Reploid, he can transform into other Reploids. Lumine is introduced as the director of the Jakob project, the Orbital elevator in the beginning of X8. He was soon kidnapped by Vile, due to his knowledge of the elevator. After defeating Sigma (originally thought to be the instigator of the events of the game once more) on normal or hard mode, Lumine is revealed to have been manipulating a weakened Sigma this time around, though he really means that he is essentially Sigma himself, and is carrying out his plans. He knows that Sigma could not do what he did in the whole series forever. He goes onto claim that this was Sigma's final death and that would be unable to return.

Mega Man Battle Network characters
The following is a list of characters from both the Mega Man Battle Network series of video games, and the MegaMan NT Warrior (Rockman EXE) anime and manga.

Protagonists

Lan Hikari

, is a fifth-grade student with a strong bond with his NetNavi, MegaMan. He is the son of Yuichiro Hikari and Haruka Hikari, and the grandson of Tadashi Hikari. He had a twin brother, Hub Hikari, who died when they were young, and it is later revealed that MegaMan.EXE is actually Hub reincarnated as data. MegaMan.EXE has a .1% modified difference in his DNA to avoid a connection between the two, but it is eventually erased, which causes them to become synchronized.

He is voiced by Alex Doduk and Brad Swaile in the English version of the anime, Mark Gatha in the English version of Mega Man Battle Network 5: Double Team DS and Kumiko Higa in Japanese.

Lan is a typical carefree, happy-go-lucky youth in search of adventure and fun. However, he is quick at noticing the smallest details thus enabling him to think calmly during a sticky situation. Lan is also known as to be dense when things aren't Net related. He frequently NetBattles, and places the prospect of completing menial tasks like homework behind him. Despite his seemingly carefree attitude, Lan is always prompt to do the right thing, either for the world, or simply for a friend. He is talented on inline skates in every version of the franchise and commonly decorates his room with soccer-themes. Lan can be quite rash at times, but his actions sometimes have a positive effect.

MegaMan.EXE
 (Mega Man) is the main NetNavi protagonist of the series. He is very close to his operator, Lan, and it is later revealed that he is actually , Lan's twin brother reincarnated as data. Hub died during early infancy from a rare heart disease, but their father, Yuichiro, managed to use Hub's DNA in his project to create the perfect NetNavi. He later spends much of his time in the real world by using a "CopyBot" as a body. In the anime, it is not revealed that he is not Lan's twin but his close friend.

He is voiced by Andrew Francis in the English version of the anime, Jeffrey Watson in the English version of Mega Man Battle Network 5: Double Team DS and Akiko Kimura in Japanese.

Mayl Sakurai
The two are next-door neighbors, and are often perceived to be a couple, though in all incarnations, Lan is clueless towards Mayl's affections. Mega Man Battle Network 6's post-credits scene revealed that Lan and Mayl eventually married and have a child together named "Patch" ("Raito"). The two have always been very close growing up. Mayl, being the more mature and intelligent of the two, is often having to beat some sense into Lan when he gets himself into trouble. The two do occasionally have oppositions, but the bickering only brings them closer. Mayl sometimes shows that she may have romantic feelings towards her lifetime friend. Roll and Megaman's relation strongly parallels that of Lan and Mayl's, though Roll is much more blatant with her affection towards Megaman. She was renamed Maylu Sakurai in the English anime and manga. It is revealed in the 5th game, when the character observes Mayl's house in a Visionburst 11 years in the past, that Mayl's father is Netopian making her at least half Netopian.

Maylu is voiced by Brittney Wilson in the English anime and by Kaori Mizuhashi in the Japanese anime.

Roll.EXE
Roll.EXE is the main female NetNavi of the series. Though she finds herself in many damsel in distress situations, she is combat-enabled and often assists MegaMan in both the games and the anime. In Battle Network 4: Red Sun, MegaMan and Roll battle each other during the Eagle Tournament. Her combat abilities include Roll Flash, an attack where she uses her antenna to whip the enemy, and Roll Arrow, which is capable of breaking loaded BattleChips; the anime adds Roll Blast, an attack where she fires several heart-shaped projectiles, to her repertoire.

She is voiced by Lenore Zann and Sharon Alexander in the English anime.

Dex Oyama
He is often portrayed as a bully with a soft spot. Dex has a younger brother named Chisao, who is seen infrequently in Battle Network, and a recurring character in the anime. In later anime episodes, Dex gives up NetBattling in order to focus on his new career as a curry chef. Renamed Dex Ogreon in the English anime and manga.

Dex is voiced by Tony Sampson in the English anime.

GutsMan.EXE
GutsMan.EXE is a large and strong Navi who believes that he and his operator are the greatest NetBattlers in the world. He is known as Guts Man in original series of Mega Man. GutsMan.EXE is also shown to have a huge crush on Roll in the anime, mirroring Dex's feelings for Maylu.

He is voiced by Scott McNeil in the English dub.

GutsMan.EXE came from the robot Guts Man in the original series of MegaMan.

Yai Ayanokoji
She is considerably younger than the other main characters, as she skipped a few grades due to her intelligence, and (in the anime) operates out of her father's company, AyanoTech (Gabcom), the original name of which is a play on the name of Capcom, the original creators of most of the MegaMan / Rockman series. In the anime (and sometimes the games), she is known for her large forehead, her gigantic blonde braids, as well as her love of strawberry milk, and secretly adores Chaud after he helped guide her out of a stuck elevator.

She is voiced by Jocelyne Loewen in the English dub.

Glide.EXE
Glide.EXE (spelt Glyde in the first game only) is a jet-themed cyber-butler armed with rare and powerful chips to help defend himself. He is based on Glyde of the Mega Man Legends series.

Glide.EXE is voiced by Ted Cole in the English dub.

Eugene Chaud
Aside from the introduction he gives in the first Mega Man Battle Network game, he is exclusively referred to by his surname, Chaud. His mother died while he was still young, and Chaud was forced into becoming the vice-president of his father's corporation, a position which contributed to his initial cold attitude towards Lan Hikari. As the series progresses, he gains more respect for Lan, and also begins to open up to others, smiling more often. He does not, however, lose his serious outlook during battle, nor does he act impulsively before thinking. In the English anime and manga, his surname was changed to Blaze and Chaud was made his first name instead, giving him the new name of Chaud Blaze.

Chaud is voiced by Bill Switzer and then by Scott Perrie in the English dub.

In the games, Chaud is an Official NetBattler, who meets Lan while investigating a water shortage caused by WWW. He was introduced as a ruthless operator who took his job seriously and would delete any Navi who got in the way, and originally saw Lan as a pest, but they slowly became friends.

ProtoMan.EXE or Blues.EXE
ProtoMan.EXE is based on Proto Man of the original Mega Man series, while also borrowing key traits from Zero of the Mega Man X series.

In the anime, he is voiced by David Kaye in the English version, and Masaya Matsukaze in the original version of the series.

Antagonists

WWW (World Three)
Formed by Lord Wily to take over the real world and cyberworld, the WWW is an organization that makes recurring appearances throughout the series, constantly met with defiance from Lan Hikari and MegaMan.EXE. Initially trying to conquer the internet by constructing the Life Virus (Dream Virus), Wily was forced to disband WWW's members and go into hiding after Lan and MegaMan.EXE foiled his plans.

Lord Wily

Lord Wily can be seen as the primary antagonist of the Battle Network franchise. He himself appears as the main villain of Mega Man Battle Network, Mega Man Battle Network 3 and Mega Man Battle Network 6. He manipulates Sean Obihiro into leading the NetMafia Gospel in Mega Man Battle Network 2, and his son Dr. Regal is the main villain of Mega Man Battle Network 4 and Mega Man Battle Network 5. He becomes jealous when his robotics research is pushed aside in favor of Tadashi Hikari's breakthroughs in network technology, and devotes his life to destroying network society. Battle Network 6 reveals that, for a time, Wily had put aside his thirst for revenge; however, the death of Baryl's father caused him to reconsider.

He is voiced by Katsumi Chō in the Japanese version and by Paul Dobson in the English dub.

Mega Man Battle Network incarnation
In Battle Network, he operates FireMan and fills the Hikari family's oven with viruses. In Battle Network 2, Match is not affiliated with Gospel, but instead lets Lan battle HeatMan.EXE at any time. In Battle Network 3, he rejoins WWW and operates FlameMan.EXE; he tricks Lan into installing several programs that raises SciLab's temperature to extreme levels.
His NetNavi, NumberMan.EXE (ナンバーマン Nanbāman), operates a similar chip shop from the cyberworld in the anime.
She was the mastermind behind an incident where the traffic signals in the city were altered as to cause accidents. In the anime, she has a brief stint with Gospel, but found friendship with her fellow WWW operators. WackoMan.EXE was found in the TV series. WackoMan.EXE duplicates himself and tries to act strong, while he is a coward. Maddy is voiced by Junko Noda in the Japanese version and by Tabitha St. Germain in the English dub. ColorMan.EXE/WackoMan.EXE is voiced by Andrew Toth in the English dub.
In the anime, he is the brother of Gauss Magnus and fosters a rivalry with his brother due to their mother's preference of one over the other, and also randomly inserts Engrish phrases into his speech in the Japanese version. In Beast+, he is confronted by Ann Zap, his wife, on the subject of inheriting the assets of his estate. Count Zap is voiced by Kenta Miyake in the Japanese version and by Colin Murdock in the English dub. ElecMan.EXE is voiced by Suzuki Chihiro in the Japanese version and by Kirby Morrow in the English dub.
 Yahoot ( in the Japanese version) – He is a WWW agent, the operator of MagicMan.EXE, and Lord Wily's right-hand man. In the anime, Yahoot is the host of a yoga television show and later becomes the owner of the curry shop Maha Ichiban. His fate is revealed in Battle Chip Challenge, where he has quit his life of crime to help support his village in the nation of Edina. In the anime, however, he is considered to be the world's foremost authority on curry, and uses the profits from his curry shop (which Lan frequents) to fund the WWW's operations. Later on, he trains Dex to be a curry chef. Yahoot is voiced by Keiiche Sonobe in the Japanese version and by Ron Halder in the English dub. MagicMan.EXE is voiced by Katsuyuki Konishi in the Japanese version and by Paul Dobson in the English dub.
 BombMan.EXE – BombMan.EXE (BlasterMan.EXE in the English dub) is a solo NetNavi that works for Lord Wily. He is voiced by Hidenari Ugaki in the Japanese version and by Nick Harrison in the English dub.
 StoneMan.EXE – StoneMan.EXE is a solo NetNavi that works for Lord Wily. He is voiced by Hiroaki Ishikawa in the Japanese version and by Ward Perry in the English dub.

Mega Man Battle Network 2 solo NetNavis
The following solo NetNavis appear in the WWW area.
 PlanetMan.EXE – PlanetMan.EXE is a planet-themed NetNavi and the acting leader of the WWW area. In the anime, PlanetMan.EXE took over a moon base and trapped Commander Beef outside when he was sent to investigate. MegaMan.EXE and GutsMan.EXE went to the Moon. While GutsMan.EXE was occupied with the viruses, MegaMan.EXE confronted PlanetMan. With Lan using an extra code given to him by Mr. Famous, MegaMan.EXE used his AquaCustom form to delete PlanetMan.EXE and save Commander Beef. PlanetMan.EXE is voiced by Dave "Squatch" Ward in the English dub.
 NapalmMan.EXE – NapalmMan.EXE (MoltanticMan.EXE in the English dub) is a solo NetNavi that works for PlanetMan.EXE. He guards the door in the WWW area that opens if the player has the V3 Navi BattleChips
 PharaohMan.EXE – PharaohMan.EXE is a solo NetNavi that works for PlanetMan.EXE. While he did appear as a secret boss in Battle Network, he appeared in Battle Network 2 in the WWW area where he tries to prevent MegaMan.EXE from advancing. In Network Transmission, PharaohMan.EXE guards the legendary WWW area. PharaohMan.EXE is voiced by Fujiwara Keiji in the Japanese version and by Michael Kopsa in the English dub.

Mega Man Battle Network 3 incarnation
 Takeo Inukai (犬飼猛雄 Inukai Takeo) – He is a member of the WWW in the games, and Neo WWW in the anime. He is the operator of BeastMan.EXE. In Battle Network 3, he was once a zookeeper who had freed all of the animals in order to scare people. In AXESS, BeastMan.EXE (SavageMan.EXE in the English dub) is a Darkloid. In Stream, Inukai was a former animal trainer that was fired due to his harsh treatment of animals and used BeastMan to control them as vengeance. He also has a pet lion named Manosuke. He gained Asteroid BeastMan.EXE from Slur. Takeo Inukai is voiced by Kiyoyuki Yanada in the Japanese version. BeastMan.EXE is voiced by Dai Matsumoto in the Japanese version and by Scott McNeil in the English dub.
 Noboru Sunayama (砂山ノボル Sunayama Noboru) – He is a member of the WWW in the games, and Neo WWW in the anime. He is the operator of DesertMan.EXE. Sunayama was a television producer of DNN who, in Battle Network 3, created the N1 Grand Prix as a plot to defeat Chaud and ProtoMan on live TV to showcase the World Three's power. In AXESS, DeserMan.EXE is a Darkloid. In Stream, he worked for DNN and stole Wily memorabilia for Tesla. He gained Asteroid DesertMan.EXE from Slur. Noboro Sunayama is voiced by Ken Narita in the Japanese version. DesertMan.EXE is voiced by Kiyoyuki Yanada in the Japanese version and by Ward Perry in the English dub.
 Rei Saiko (西古レイ Saiko Rei, Ray Saiko in the English version of Battle Chip Challenge) – He is a WWW operator in the games, and a member of Neo WWW in the anime. He is the operator of FlashMan.EXE. He is the least acknowledged of the Neo WWW and, other than his introductory episode, where he operated a Navi-driven race car, all of his plots involve assistance to other members of the Neo WWW. In AXESS, FlashMan.EXE is a Darkloid. In Stream, Rei gained Asteroid FlashMan.EXE. Rei Saiko is voiced by Nobuyuki Hiyama in the Japanese version. FlashMan.EXE is voiced by Makoto Yasumura in the Japanese version and by Clay St. Thomas in the English dub.
 Anetta (アネッタ Anetta) – She is the operator of PlantMan.EXE in the games, and Silk.EXE in the anime. In the games, she is a WWW agent and is brainwashed by Wily into believing that the cyberworld is destroying nature. In the anime, she had been plagued by illness for most of her life with Silk.EXE acting as her nurse while PlantMan.EXE (renamed VineMan.EXE in the English dub) is a Darkloid. Silk was deleted trying to save her from a burning hospital, but Anetta fostered a grudge towards Chaud due to her misconception of the situation. After discovering the truth, she becomes Yai's rival for Chaud's affections. Anetta is voiced by Rie Kugimiya in the Japanese version and by Maryke Hendrikse in the English dub. PlantMan.EXE is voiced by Hiroyuki Yoshino in the Japanese version and by Scott Logie in the English dub.
 BubbleMan.EXE – A solo NetNavi that works for Lord Wily and is DrillMan's "cousin." In AXESS, BubbleMan.EXE is a Darkloid that is loyal to ShadeMan. He is voiced by Chiyako Shibahara in the Japanese version and by Gabe Khouth in the English dub.
 DrillMan.EXE – A solo NetNavi that works for Lord Wily and is BubbleMan's "cousin." In the anime, DrillMan.EXE is owned by the assistant of a small company president and used to distract ProtoMan.EXE while he got away with a part needed for the new PET only for him to run into the WWW members. DrillMan.EXE is voiced by Trevor Devall in the English dub.
Punk.EXE - A NetNavi operated by Mr. Famous. He appears as an optional boss in the Blue version of Mega Man Battle Network 3. Mr. Famous appears in Yoka, tells a secret to Lan Hikari and challenges him to a NetBattle, operating Punk.EXE as his NetNavi. Defeating him will always give only Zenny. If MegaMan.EXE has the Navi Customizer program "Collect" and defeats Punk, no data will be received.
As Punk is Keiji Inafune's favourite character in the classic series, he insisted on redesigning Punk for this game.

Mega Man Battle Network 6 incarnation
 Mayor Cain – He is the mayor of Cyber City and the benefactor of WWW. He later leads a split faction of the organization. Mayor Cain's grandfather was the one who created Falzar to counter the threat of Gregar which led to events that made his grandfather an outcast.
 Joe Mach ( in the Japanese version) – He is Lan's teacher at Cyber Academy, but is later revealed to be BlastMan.EXE's operator as well as a WWW agent. He joined the organization because Wily once saved his daughter's life, but betrays WWW to save Lan.
 Blackbeard ( in the Japanese version) – He is an animal trainer at Seaside Town's aquarium and the operator of DiveMan.EXE. He is a member of the WWW in Battle Network 6, and works for Wily of Beyondard in Beast. He and Yuika find themselves stranded in the world opposite of their own in Beast+, forming an alliance with BubbleMan to commit crimes.
 Yuika ( in the Japanese version) – She is the operator of CircusMan.EXE. She is a member of the WWW in Battle Network 6, and works for Wily of Beyondard in Beast. She and Blackbeard find themselves stranded in the world opposite of their own in Beast+, forming an alliance with BubbleMan to commit crimes.
 Vic ( in the Japanese version) – He is the operator of ElementMan.EXE. He is a member of the WWW in Battle Network 6, and is a troubled weather forecaster who is fired from his job in the anime. BubbleMan loans him a Miniroid, and he has ElementMan hack the Marine Land pool system to get revenge on Lan and co. when they unknowingly make fun of him.
 Prosecutor Ito ( in the Japanese version) – A court prosecutor and the operator of JudgeMan.EXE. He is a member of the WWW in Battle Network 6, and wishes to eliminate NetCrime in the anime by unilaterally convicting Navis before they are taken into custody.
 Baryl (Barrel, バレル Bareru) – He is the operator of Colonel.EXE, and an official NetBattler from Netopia who seeks Lan and MegaMan to form Team Colonel. However, in Battle Network 6, he joins the WWW (World Three). As a child, he was placed in Lord Wily's care while his father went to war; once Wily learned that Baryl's father was killed in combat, he raised Baryl as his own son. In the anime, Baryl lived twenty years before the start of Stream (and would die at the beginning of the series), leaving Colonel.EXE a solo Navi. With technology known as the Past Tunnel, he is able to communicate with the characters of the present time, and subsequently travel between timeframes. In the show, he is an old friend of Dr. Wily, while in the games is the doctor's adopted son.
  – Operated by Baryl, Colonel.EXE is the head of an elite team of Navis who freed the net from Nebula's influence in Battle Network 5, and part of the WWW in Battle Network 6. He is a cold, ruthless Navi; it is later revealed late in the sixth game that his emotion data was separated from him and used to create a new Navi, Iris.EXE. His signature attacks include Screen Divide, where he performs different-shaped sword slashes, and Aspire Break, a hard-hitting finishing move.

MegaMan Network Transmission incarnation
 Professor – The Professor is an unnamed man who is the main antagonist of MegaMan Network Transmission. According to Higsby, he is a high-ranking WWW member who was the acting leader of WWW at the time when Lord Wily was in hiding. He spread the Zero Virus that caused trouble in the Net. After Zero was converted into a NetNavi thanks to the MystData, he helped to defeat the Professor who was then arrested by the NetPolice. In Beast+, the Professor is responsible for the Beast viruses that appear and his creation of the Zero Virus remains intact. Yahoot claims that the Professor is a WWW researcher who is not in the field like the other WWW members. The Professor owns a sushi factpry that serves as a front for his secret laboratory that is underneath. After Zero sacrificed his life to destroy the Professor's airship, the Professor escapes from its destruction by parachute and is arrested by the NetPolice. The Professor is voiced by Takurō Kitagawa in the Japanese version.
 GravityMan.EXE – GravityMan.EXE is a solo NetNavi that works for the Professor. He encounters MegaMan.EXE in the Strange Grav Center where he acted as sentry. GravityMan.EXE initiates his extermination sequence only to be deleted by MegaMan.EXE. In AXESS, GravityMan.EXE is a Darkloid. GravityMan.EXE is voiced by Yoshimitsu Shimoyama in the Japanese version and by Robert O. Smith in the English dub.
 StarMan.EXE – StarMan.EXE (NovaMan.EXE in the English dub) is a solo NetNavi that works for the Professor. He was going around distributing fake vaccines for the Zero Virus and retreats when confronted by MegaMan.EXE. In the No Grav Zone, StarMan.EXE fights MegaMan.EXE and is deleted. In AXESS, StarMan.EXE is a Darkloid. StarMan.EXe is voiced by Kumiko Yokote in the Japanese version.
 SwordMan.EXE – SwordMan.EXE is a solo NetNavi that works for the Professor where the three swords give him a different personality. He appears as a boss that is guarding the path to the Life Virus. SwordMan.EXE defeated ProtoMan.EXE before being defeated by MegaMan.EXE. In the anime, SwordMan.EXE is a Darkloid. In the Japanese version, SwordMan.EXE's three heads are voiced by Tetsu Inada (red sword), Daisuke Kirii (blue sword), and Tsuguo Mogami (yellow sword). In the English dub, SwordMan.EXE is voiced by Paul Dobson.

NetMafia Gospel
 refers to a NetMafia organization led by the mysterious  and the wolf-like monstrosity that is unleashed by the organization. (Boss Gospel is renamed Kid Grave, and the organization and creature are both renamed Grave and Grave Virus Beast respectively in the English anime.) In Battle Network 2, the creature known as Gospel was created from a collection of bugs in various programs, while in the anime, Gospel and Bass were created from the remnants of PharaohMan. Gospel and the Cybeast Gregar are similar in appearance because of the way they were born; from a fusion of bugs.

Sean Obihiro
As a child, Sean's parents were killed in an airplane crash. Ostracized by his peers, he decided to strike back at society by forming Gospel while taking the alias of Lord Gospel (Kid Grave in the English dub). Unbeknownst to him, he was manipulated by Wily the entire time. Sean would eventually change his ways when Lan offers him a hand in friendship. In Battle Chip Challenge, it was revealed that FreezeMan was his original NetNavi. In the manga, he works undercover as Kei Yuki, an extremely bright professor from Ameroupe. In the anime, his Lord Gospel form is a robot that is controlled by Lord Wily. After the Gospel virus is destroyed, Lord Gospel's robot body is taken over by Bass.

He is voiced by Noriko Hidaka in the Japanese version of the first anime, Junko Minagawa in the Japanese version of AXESS, and Cathy Weseluck in the English dub.

Members of Gospel
 Gauss Magnus – He is the CEO of Gauss Inc. original operator of MagnetMan. He is rich and second-in-command of Gospel. In the games, he met his end at the hands of Lan while attempting to hijack an airplane. In the anime, he is a cross-dresser with "Wily-mania" that was defeated by WWW. Gauss also reveals that Count Zap is his brother, something that was only strongly implied in the games. In Stream, he acts as Neo WWW's janitor for a short period of time before playing matchmaker for his daughter and Charlie Airstar. Gauss is voiced by Hideyuki Umezu in the Japanese version and by Ron Halder in the English dub. MagnetMan is voiced by Tomoyuki Komo in the Japanese version and by Michael Dobson in the English dub.
  – He is the operator of AirMan. In Battle Network 2 and the anime, he has AirMan hack into Yai's air conditioning system to infect it with gas. While he posed as a mechanic in the game, Arashi is the owner of a small company outdone by Ayano Tech and controlled AirMan from a courtesy phone in the subway station. In the game, he is supposedly killed by a bomb hidden in a suitcase as punishment for his failure. In the anime, he is caught by the NetAgents upon his defeat and arrested by the police. Arashi is voiced by Brian Dobson in the English dub. AirMan is voiced by Susumu Chiba in the Japanese version and by Peter New in the English dub.
 Speedy Dave ( in the Japanese version) – He is a park ranger in the game, and is Sal's childhood friend in the anime. He is the operator of QuickMan. He dislikes littering and the destruction of nature, thus he sided with Gospel to destroy the dam in the game and is arrested after being defeated by Lan. In the anime, he just gave a warning to the humans by pretending to side to with Gospel and wasn't arrested. Speedy Dave is voiced by Kosuke Okano in the Japanese version and by Kirby Morrow in the English dub. QuickMan is voiced by Masaru Motegi in the Japanese version and by Alistair Abell in the English dub.
 Mr. Dark ( in the Japanese version) – He is a mysterious mercenary-for-hire who sides with Gospel in the second game and Team Colonel in the fifth (under the alias of Dusk in the English versions), and the operator of ShadowMan. In the anime, only his Navi appeared in the second season of EXE while he made his appearance in Stream. In both cases, he and ShadowMan were out to eliminate MegaMan until Lord Wily convinced him to put aside his work and join Lan. In the anime, he becomes one of the Cross Fusion members marked by Duo. Mr. Dark is voiced by Kenichi Obo in the Japanese version. ShadowMan is voiced by Kentaro Ito in the Japanese version and by Ron Halder in the English dub.
  – She is the princess of Creamland (Brightland in the English anime) and the operator of KnightMan. In Battle Network 2, she attempts to kill a group of Official NetBattlers using booby traps, but inadvertently falls into one herself. Chaud suspects that she joined Gospel to get revenge on the countries that abandoned Creamland. In Battle Network 5: Team Colonel, she seeks to help Creamland by mining MagnoMetal, but in doing this accidentally puts Mayl, Dex, and Yai in danger. Pride and KnightMan join Team Colonel afterwards. In the anime, she befriended Lan while disguised as a boy, and resurfaces in Stream as one of the Cross Fusion members marked by Duo. Princess Pride is voiced by Tomoko Kawakami in the Japanese version and by Jillian Michaels in the English dub. KnightMan is voiced by Jin Horikawa in the Japanese version and by Russell Roberts in the English dub.
 FreezeMan.EXE – FreezeMan.EXE is a solo NetNavi that works for Gospel and heads up the Gospel attacks on the Net. He took control of the environmental control systems around the world to cause natural disasters. In the anime, FreezeMan.EXE is responsible for the near-deletion of FireMan.EXE. He later controls the robot penguins to freeze all of DenTech City. MegaMan.EXE had a hard time fighting FreezeMan.EXE until HeatMan.EXE shows up to help drive away FreezeMan. During the threat of the Gospel Virus, FreezeMan.EXE fights HeatMan.EXE again where HeatMan.EXE manages to defeat him. When FreezeMan.EXE retreats back to Gospel to have Lord Gospel heal him, ShadowMan.EXE arrives and deletes him (FreezeMan.EXE's deletion at the hands of ShadowMan.EXE is removed from the English dub and was changed to make it look like that HeatMan.EXE deleted him). FreezeMan.EXE is voiced by Soichiro Tanaka in the Japanese version and by Mark Oliver in the English dub.
 CutMan.EXE – CutMan.EXE is a solo NetNavi that is the vice-commander of Yumland's Occupation force and is tasked to eliminate the survivors of the countries that ShadowMan.EXE attacks. He is deleted by MegaMan.EXE. In the anime, CutMan.EXE is briefly heard warning MegaMan.EXE and his allies about the threat of Grave. CutMan.EXE makes himself known to MegaMan.EXE following QuickMan.EXE's failure to destroy the dam. Combining with WoodMan.EXE's powers, MegaMan.EXE uses the Electro-Wood Tower to delete CutMan.EXE. It is revealed that CutMan.EXE had five brothers named Jirō, Saburō, Shirō, Gorō, and Rokurō (Vinny, Sammy, Jerry, Joey, and Nicky in the English dub) that attempted to take revenge on MegaMan.EXE for killing their brother Tarō. In the Japanese version, CutMan.EXE Tarō and CutMan.EXE Jirō are voiced by Chiyako Shibahara, CutMan.EXE Saburō is voiced by Tomoko Ishimura, CutMan.EXE Shirō is voiced by Kei Kobayashi, CutMan.EXE Gorō is voiced by Kumiko Watanabe, CutMan.EXE Rokurō is voiced by Kaori Matoi, and CutMan.EXE Chōrō is voiced by Hiroshi Ito. In the English dub, all the CutMan.EXE brothers are voiced by Scott McNeil.

Nebula
DarkChip Syndicate Nebula is the antagonist group of Mega Man Battle Network 4 and Mega Man Battle Network 5. It is unique in that, aside from Dr. Regal (and Ms. Yuri in the anime), no named human operators are shown to be involved with the group.

Dr. Regal
 is the human mastermind behind Nebula, and the operator of LaserMan. He is Dr. Wily's son and comes from the small, authoritarian country known as Nation Z.

He is introduced in Battle Network 4, as one of the scientists working together to prevent Duo's asteroid from striking the planet. However, near the end of the game, he reveals that he is behind the spread of "Dark Chips." He sends LaserMan into the asteroid, but MegaMan pursues the Navi. LaserMan is deleted in the resulting battle, and MegaMan manages to avert the crisis. Dr. Regal leaps from the top of the NAXA building to avoid arrest, and is presumed dead.

In Battle Network 5, he kidnaps Dr. Hikari and uses Nebula to take over the entirety of Cyberworld. As Team ProtoMan or Team Colonel slowly take back the internet, Regal prepares to activate the SoulNet system. Using SoulNet, which was developed by Tadashi Hikari and Dr. Wily to connect human emotions, and Nebula Grey, a monstrous program that is the embodiment of evil, he plans to forever corrupt the population. However, he is thwarted by MegaMan, who destroys Nebula Grey and the DarkChips. After the battle, Regal has a decade of his memory erased; the Team Colonel version of the game reveals that it was Dr. Wily that caused this amnesia. He is seen working at SciLab at the end of the game.

In the anime, Dr. Regal is the top energy scientist of Kingland. In the past, he was rescued from a plane crash by Duo, who selected him as a probe to monitor life on Earth, and adopted by Wily. In Axess, he visits Dr. Hikari to look over a commandeered Dimensional Converter used by the Darkloids to substantiate in the real world, but is eventually recognized as the leader of Nebula. He, along with Ms. Yuri, collaborate with the Darkloids to wreak havok on Cyberworld. When ShadeMan, leader of the Darkloids, becomes suspicious of the humans, he is assaulted by LaserMan and is forced to flee. Dr. Regal later uses Regal Tower to create a worldwide Dimensional Area. After deleting ShadeMan once and for all, the now-Cross Fused Dr. Regal moves to destroy SciLab. He is thwarted by Lan and MegaMan, who use "Full Synchro" to badly damage him.

Dr. Regal is voiced by Kazuhiro Nakata in Japanese, and Trevor Devall in the English dub.

In Rockman EXE: Program of Light and Dark, it is revealed that Regal has become badly fragmented data. He fuses with Nebula Grey (a program created by Dr. Wily) and attempts to use the "Spectrum" phenomenon to gain access to, and eventually destroy, the real world. After being defeated by MegaMan and Bass, he reappears in Stream, using the Crests of Duo to obtain great power. However, he is destroyed once and for all by Duo himself.

Dr. Regal first appears in volume 10 of the Mega Man NT Warrior manga as the weapon development director for the country, Netopia. Later on it is discovered that Dr. Regal is behind the Darkloids in the Netopia Net Army and that he wants MegaMan's ability to merge with Bass, so that Nebula Grey can become even more powerful. However, using Beast Out, MegaMan destroys Nebula Grey. Bass then destroys Dr. Regal's submarine, killing him.

Darkloids
The Darkloids are a group of solo Navis that are addicted to DarkChips. They are Nebula operatives in the games, while they are an independent group that collaborates with the organization in the anime.
 ShadeMan.EXE – A vampire bat-themed Navi that appears in Battle Network 4 and Battle Network 5. Near the beginning of Battle Network 4, he kidnaps Roll with the intent of devouring her energy. MegaMan attempts to battle him, but cannot hit him due to his "Dark Power." ShadeMan leaves, but not before dropping a DarkChip. This DarkChip is later used by MegaMan to defeat Shademan. In an optional side quest, Solar Boy Django and MegaMan use the PileDriver in an attempt to delete the Navi once and for all. He returns in Battle Network 5 as one of the Darkloids that have taken over Cyberworld; he controls Oran Island's network. In the anime, he is the leader of the Darkloids. After discovering that the DarkChips will eventually delete any Navi that uses them, ShadeMan attempts in vain to kill Regal. LaserMan takes ShadeMan's position as the leader of the Darkloids, and ShadeMan is later deleted by a Cross Fused Dr. Regal. ShadeMan.EXE is voiced by Hidetoshi Nakamura in the Japanese version and by Scott McNeil in the English dub.
 LaserMan.EXE – Dr. Regal's personal Navi. He attempts to control Duo's comet in Battle Network 4, and Cross Fuses with Regal during the climax of Axess so that they can destroy SciLab. LaserMan.EXE is voiced by Kazuhiro Nakata in the Japanese version and by Michael Kopsa in the English dub.
 BlizzardMan.EXE – A snow-themed Navi. He holds control over ACDC's network. BlizzardMan.EXE is voiced by Akio Suyama in the Japanese version.
 CloudMan.EXE – A cloud-themed Navi that controls SciLab's network. CloudMan.EXE is voiced by Tomoyuki Shimura in the Japanese version.
 CosmoMan.EXE – An asteroid-themed Navi who holds control over part of End City's network. He succeeded LaserMan.EXE as the leader of the Darkloids following his deletion. CosmoMan.EXE is voiced by Sōichirō Tanaka in the Japanese version.
 Dark MegaMan.EXE – Dark MegaMan.EXE is an evil clone of MegaMan.EXE that is created when Lan used the vaccine chip to free MegaMan.EXE from the influence of the DarkChips. Dark MegaMan.EXE is voiced by Akiko Kimura in the Japanese version.

Duo.EXE
 is a mysterious being from outer space. In both Mega Man Battle Network 4 and Rockman EXE Stream, Duo seeks to "cleanse" Earth of evil.

In the games, Duo is the operating system of an asteroid poised to destroy Earth. He was attracted to the planet by the spread of Dark Chips that was instigated by Nebula. After Dr. Regal sabotages NAXA's attempts to divert the asteroid, he sends LaserMan in an attempt to control it; however, LaserMan is deleted by MegaMan. Duo then appears before MegaMan and, after forcing the Navi to fight his own dark soul, engages him in battle. MegaMan manages to destroy Duo's battle body and, using the energy of humans worldwide, successfully changes the asteroid's course. Before MegaMan leaves, Duo warns that he will return again someday.

In the anime, he is a god-like entity created by an alien race. Fifteen years prior to Stream, Duo visits Earth and rescues Dr. Regal and Ms. Yuri from a plane crash, turning them into probes. He returns after having seen the violence brought on by Regal, but decides to spare humankind if it proves its worth. He is voiced by Kenji Nomura.

Duo possesses a variety of extremely potent abilities, many of them manifesting themselves in the form of space-age weaponry. His fists can detach and fire through rocket propulsion to strike his enemies. His chest cavity houses explosive artillery, which is launched in either a direct or homing fashion, as either mines or missiles. This cavity may also compress in on itself to release a powerful focused laser beam that fans out at certain points along the spectrum. His most devastating technique is Anger Impact, where he releases a wave of energy that resembles his face. In the anime, Duo also possesses the ability to separate Navis and operators from Cross Fusion with a mere thought, allowing them to take on physical bodies while in his asteroid.

Cybeasts
The Cybeasts are the titular cyber beasts from Mega Man Battle Network 6: Cybeast Gregar/Cybeast Falzar. They were originally created by the grandfather of Mayor Cain. Lord Wily seeks to obtain the legendary beasts so that he may wreak havoc on both Cyberworld and the real world. Their exact roles in the story depend on the game version: the title Cybeast is absorbed by MegaMan.EXE and is later destroyed by him, while the opposite Cybeast is absorbed by CircusMan.EXE and is ultimately deleted by Colonel and Iris.

In the anime, Gregar and Falzar each lead an army of Zoanoroids.

Cybeast Gregar

In the anime, he is the leader of the Gregar Army which consists of Zoanoroid versions of BlizzardMan.EXE, DarkMan.EXE, FlameMan.EXE, GutsMan.EXE, JunkMan.EXE, MetalMan.EXE, NapalmMan.EXE, NumberMan.EXE, PharaohMan.EXE, PlantMan.EXE, QuickMan.EXE, Sparkman.EXE, StoneMan.EXE, WhaleMan.EXE, and YamatoMan.EXE.

Cybeast Falzar

In the anime, he is the leader of the Falzar Army which consists of Zoanoroid versions of CloudMan.EXE, FreezeMan.EXE, GateMan.EXE, KendoMan.EXE, LarkMan.EXE, Meddy.EXE, Punk.EXE, SnakeMan.EXE, SwordMan.EXE, and the CutMan.EXE Brothers. Zoanoroid SparkMan.EXE used to be part Falzar's army until he was converted to Gregar's army by Zoanoroid PharaohMan.EXE.

Bass.EXE
Bass was falsely blamed for causing massive problems in the original internet, and was nearly killed by the SciLab Elite Corps. Dr. Cossack, the only human he trusted and his creator, was arrested before he could plug out Bass to safety, leading Bass to believe that he had betrayed him as well and hates humanity since then.

In Battle Network 2, Sean Obihiro of Gospel attempted to make a clone army of Bass copies, eventually leading to the accidental creation of the Gospel Megavirus. During the game's ending, Bass is shown deleting one such clone and swearing revenge upon mankind. Bass returns to fulfill his promise in Battle Network 3, where he assists Wily in using Alpha to destroy network society; however, Bass is swallowed up by Alpha along with Wily himself. He is then approached by the remains of the Gospel Megavirus, which saves him and fuses with him. He is later confronted by MegaMan in the secret area, and narrowly defeated. It is revealed that he suffers from amnesia, but Megaman is successful to remind him of his creator, Cossack. Thrown into confusion, Bass leaves.

In Battle Network 4, Bass is found deep in the Undernet hibernating as a statue, and reawakens upon meeting Megaman. Once again defeated, he retreats and vows to become stronger. In Battle Network 5, a post-game boss created by dark power takes on his likeness, but his true self can also be fought. Whenever defeated, he leaves of his own volition; this trend continues until Battle Network 6. There, Bass is confronted in his gravestone in the Undernet and numerous times afterwards. The final confrontation with Bass is his most powerful, when he has absorbed a cybeast's power into his body. When defeated, he drifts away into the net and is available as a random encounter in the Graveyard area.

In the anime, Bass was created from PharaohMan's data by Wily. Bass came to exist from the left over data of PharaohMan that Wily didn't use to make Gospel. While Gospel contains PharaohMan's ultimate program, Bass on the other hand is the reincarnation of PharaohMan's soul but lacking any memories, which were used in making Gospel, though he later recovered his memories after reading Megaman's memories. Bass is voiced by Matt Hill in the English dub.

In the manga, Bass' background stays true like the original but with a darker and more sinister personality. He is infamously known as the 'Black Shadow', the strongest Net Navi in the Undernet. Also, compared to the anime and the game, Bass is portrayed having deeper rivalry and to an extent, friendship with MegaMan.

Other characters

Recurring

Dr. Yuichiro Hikari
  is Lan's father, and the creator of MegaMan. He followed in his father's footsteps, working as a scientist and a renowned authority on anything having to do with the net. As such, he is often away, working on his latest project at SciLab. In Axess, his focus moves onto merging operator and NetNavi in a process known as Cross Fusion, which later inspired the "Double Soul" ("Soul Unison") concept in the games.

Yuichiro's father, Dr. Tadashi Hikari, is considered to be the founder of the computer networking system within the Battle Network series. As such, Yuichiro is looked upon as an expert in the subject of networking. Although he is not seen with a NetNavi of his own, he is the creator of numerous NetNavis, including MegaMan.EXE. In the games, in an attempt to save his dying son, Hub, he creates MegaMan by placing the boy's DNA into a Navi program.

In the anime, Yuichiro is often the scientist responsible for new designs and additions to already existing PET models, and his research into the nature of Dimensional Areas leads to the creation of the "Synchro Chip" permitting Cross Fusion, a unique ability that allows an operator to merge with his/her NetNavi.

In the Japanese version, Yuichiro Hikari is voiced by Koichi Nagano and later by Tokuyoshi Kawashima in Stream-Beast+. In the English dub, Yuichiro Hikari is voiced by Michael Adamthwaite.

Haruka Hikari
 is Lan's caring mother, who works at home and prepares extravagant meals for her husband and son. In the anime, she is portrayed as somewhat naïve, though she always wishes the best for her loved ones. In the 5th game, Haruka ends up inviting Mayl over in order to teach her cooking, while Mayl returns the favor and teaches her to NetBattle.

Haruka Hikari is voiced by Masako Jo in the Japanese version and by Nicole Oliver in the English dub.

Dr. Tadashi Hikari
 is the inventor of Cyberworld. He bears a visual resemblance to Dr. Light of the Classic Mega Man series (this is explained by the Japanese word "Hikari" loosely meaning "Light"). He passes away long before the events of the Battle Network series, and only appears in the form of archived data.

Mr. Famous
Mr. Famous ( in the Japanese version) is a scientist working with Yuichiro. In the games, he is the creator of several powerful Navis, including GateMan.EXE, KendoMan.EXE., GridMan.EXE (FootMan.EXE in the English dub), and Punk.EXE, although he does not have one in the anime. Mr. Famous is voiced by Keiji Fujiwara in the Japanese version and by Jonathan Holmes in the English dub.

Solo NetNavis
The Solo NetNavis are NetNavis that have no owner. Besides the ones that work for WWW, Gospel, and the Darkloids, the following Solo NetNavis are listed below.
 BowlMan.EXE – BowlMan.EXE is a bowling-themed NetNavi. In the Blue version of Battle Network 3, he possesses the #2 Undernet ranking. In AXESS, BowlMan.EXE was given a DarkChip by a Darkloid which improves his game. This corrupts him causing CrossFusion MegaMan.EXE to delete him. BowlMan.EXE is voiced by Tōru Ōkawa in the Japanese version and by Colin Murdock in the English dub.
 BrightMan.EXE – BrightMan.EXE is a light-themed NetNavi. In Network Transmission, BrightMan.EXE falls prey to the fake vaccine to the Zero Virus. MegaMan.EXE had to defeat him in order to get him cured. It is implied that he has an owner that runs one of the shops in the shopping district. In AXESS, BrightMan.EXE is a Darkloid who has been pursued by Raoul and ThunderMan.EXE where he deleted a Navi friend of theirs. During the Darkloids' fight with SearchMan.EXE and ThunderMan.EXE, BrightMan.EXE is deleted by ThunderMan.EXE. BrightMan.EXE is voiced by Katsuyuki Konishi in the Japanese version and by Richard Ian Cox in the English dub.
 ClockMan.EXE – ClockMan.EXE is a time-traveling NetNavi that appears in Rockman.EXE Operate Shooting Star. He likes to collect beautiful women from different time periods. It took the collaboration of MegaMan.EXE and the Star Force Mega Man to defeat ClockMan.EXE.
 DarkMan.EXE – DarkMan.EXE is a powerful NetNavi from Battle Network 3. Mega Man encountered DarkMan.EXE in the Secret Area of the Undernet after deleting 10,000 Navis.
 JunkMan.EXE – JunkMan.EXE (JunkDataMan.EXE in the English dub) is a NetNavi that was born from junk data. In Battle Network 4, JunkMan.EXE faces off against MegaMan.EXE in the Blue Moon Tournament. In AXESS, JunkMan.EXE gathers satellites and other space junk to make up his castle. This led to a confrontation with MegaMan.EXE, Roll.EXE, and Glide.EXE. JunkMan.EXE is voiced by Kenta Miyake in the Japanese version and by Terry Klassen in the English dub.
 LarkMan.EXE – LarkMan.EXE (known as SwallowMan.EXE in Japan) is a bird-themed NetNavi. He appears in Battle Network 5 as an optional boss in Undernet 1. In Stream, LarkMan.EXE is a Darkloid who works for Dark MegaMan.EXE. LarkMan.EXE is voiced by Kishō Taniyama in the Japanese version.
 MistMan.EXE – MistMan.EXE is a genie-themed NetNavi. In the White version of Battle Network 3, he possesses the #2 Undernet ranking. In AXESS, MistMan.EXE appears in a castle that emerges from the sand in the desert and he obeys whoever holds his lamp. MistMan.EXE is voiced by Jūrōta Kosugi in the Japanese version.
 Serenade.EXE – Serenade is a NetNavi who is the ruler of the Undernet. In Battle Network 3, Serenade makes her base in the Undernet's server.
 YamatoMan.EXE – YamatoMan.EXE (JapanMan.EXE in the English version of the games) is a spear-wielding armored samurai-themed NetNavi. In Battle Network 3, YamatoMan.EXE used to work for SciLab before leaving to work for Serenade in the Undernet. MegaMan.EXE fights YamatoMan.EXE in the second section of the Secret Area.

Other recurring characters
 Ms. Mari, known in the Japanese versions as  – She is the teacher of class 5-A at the ACDC/DenTech school (Densan), of which Lan, Mayl, Dex and Yai are students. She serves as the adult chaperon to many of Lan's activities. She does not have a NetNavi in the anime, and uses a generic one in the games. Ms. Mari is voiced by Noriko Hidaka in the Japanese version and by Janyse Jaud in the English dub.
 Sal – She is the owner of a boxed lunch stand and an environmentalist; she is also the operator of WoodMan.EXE. In the anime, she is a gardener who takes on the identity  as a Net Agent; unlike Maysa/Commander Beef, Sal uses WoodMan with and without her disguise, leaving little doubt about her secret identity. She also has a crush on Dave in the anime. Sal is voiced by Omi Minami in the Japanese version and by Kelly Sheridan in the English dub. WoodMan.EXE is voiced by Toshihide Tsuchiya in the Japanese version and by Lee Tockar in the English dub.
 Ribitta – She is a television personality at DNN, and is often seen as a reporter or a television host. She is the operator of ToadMan.EXE. She was a fairly minor character in the games until Battle Network 5, when she joined with Team Colonel while trying to get an interview with the team. In the anime she, along with Higsby, are the commentators for the N1 Grand Prix. Ribbita is voiced by Akiko Nakagawa in the Japanese version and by Sharon Alexander in the Englishdub. ToadMan.EXE is voiced by Akiko Nakagawa in the Japanese version and by Samuel Vincent in the English dub.
  – He is the operator of ThunderMan.EXE. In the anime, he is the leader of a gang called "Team Thunder" that opposes a corrupt Netopian mayor. He and Chaud often dress up in disco outfits while on missions together. Raoul is voiced by Nobuo Tobito in the Japanese version and by Mark Gibbon in the English dub. ThunderMan.EXE is voiced by Daiki Nakamura in the Japanese version and by David Kaye in the English dub.
  – She is the owner of a souvenir stall in front of Yoka Hot Springs, and the operator of MetalMan.EXE (HeavyMetalMan.EXE in the English dub). In the anime, she has a passion for NetBattling and offers her customers the opportunity to take home her merchandise without paying if they are able to defeat her. Tamako Shiraizumi is voiced by Takako Honda in the Japanese version and by Willow Johnson in the English dub. MetalMan.EXE is voiced by Susumu Chiba in the Japanese version and by John Payne in the English dub.
  – He is Dex's younger brother, and originally lived in Netopia. He is too young to operate his own NetNavi, although he is a NetBattling prodigy (pulling off a Program Advance with GutsMan in the anime when Dex himself could not). He is firm in his belief that his brother is the world's best NetBattler and GutsMan the world's best NetNavi. Renamed Chisao Ogreon in the English anime and manga. Chisao is voiced by Tomoko Ishimura in the Japanese version and by Nathan Tipple in the English dub.
  – She is the operator of AquaMan.EXE (SpoutMan.EXE in all English media except Battle Network 4) who believes that she is the unluckiest girl in the world because of bad things that always seem to happen coincidentally around her. In Battle Network 4: Blue Moon, she is one of Lan's opponents in the first tournament; later on, AquaMan.EXE attempts to help MegaMan fight LaserMan.EXE, but is instead possessed by MegaMan's Dark Soul. In Battle Network 6: Cybeast Falzar, Shuko works as both a teacher and an employee of the Seaside Aquarium in order to put her twin brothers Atsu and Ty (Atsuho and Taichi) through college. In the anime after Higsby installs a sense of confidence in her, she begins to idolize him and work at his chip shop. Shuko is voiced by Mamiko Noto in the Japanese version and by Chantal Strand in the English dub. AquaMan.EXE is voiced by Chiemi Chiba in the Japanese version and by Matt Hill in the English dub.
 Raika – He is a NetSaver from Sharo, and the operator of SearchMan.EXE. He was trained to be an elite soldier, and sees NetBattling as war. SearchMan.EXE is voiced by Jun Fukuyama in the Japanese version and by Brian Dobson in the English dub.
  – Dingo is a Netopian who takes a quick liking to Lan, and the operator of TomahawkMan.EXE.

References

Sources
 

Mega Man and Bass 2